Petrus de Dacia, also called Philomena and Peder Nattergal (Peter Nightingale), was a Danish scholar who lived in the 13th century. He worked mainly in Paris and Italy, writing in Latin. He published a calendar of new moon dates for the years 1292-1367. In 1292, he published a book on mathematics that contained a new method for the calculation of cubic roots. He also described a mechanical instrument to predict solar and lunar eclipses as seen from Paris.

Editions
Corpus Philosophorum Danicorum Medii Aevi vol. X, ed. Fritz Saaby Pedersen. Copenhagen 1983.
Petri Philomeni de Dacia in Algorismum vulgarem Johannis de Sacrobosco commentarius, edited by Maximilian Curtze, year 1897. This text by Petrus Philomena de Dacia is a commentary about elementary methods in arithmetic. Its primary notability is that it has a better method for extracting cube roots (better than the pre-existing method reported by Johannes de Sacrobosco).

References
Pedersen, Olaf (in: Complete Dictionary of Scientific Biography. 2008. http://www.encyclopedia.com/doc/1G2-2830903368.html) 
Rasch, G. (1932) Petrus de Dacia, pp. 12-15 in: Meisen, V. Prominent Danish Scientists through the Ages. University Library of Copenhagen 450th Anniversary. Levin & Munksgaard, Copenhagen

13th-century mathematicians
Danish mathematicians
Danish science writers
Danish scientific instrument makers
13th-century Danish people